Born to Fly  is an upcoming Chinese military film set against the backdrop of the decades of modernization of the People's Liberation Army Air Force. Directed by Liu Xiaoshi and produced by Han Han, starring Wang Yibo, Hu Jun, Yu Shi, and Zhou Dongyu.

Plot
The story of a special operations team headed by elite pilots , being ordered to test new fighter jets. Test flight after test flight, they continue to challenge the sky and the limits of themselves.

Cast
Wang Yibo
Hu Jun
Yu Shi
Zhou Dongyu (special appearance)

Production
Born to Fly completed filming in May of 2022 and was slated to release during the Chinese national holiday on September 30th 2022, but it was shelved for unknown reasons which spark controversy both domestically and internationally.

In January 2023, exactly 100 days after it was shelved, the film released new promotional materials and a few days later, announced a release date of May 2023 for the Chinese Labor Day holiday.

References

External links 

Chinese aviation films
Polybona Films films
China Film Group Corporation films
Alibaba Pictures films